The 1998 Oceania Athletics Championships were held at the Teufaiva Stadium in Nuku'alofa, Tonga, between August 27–28, 1998.  

A total of 39 events were contested, 21 by men and 18 by women.

Medal summary
Medal winners were published.  Complete results can be found as compiled by Bob Snow from Athletics PNG.

Men

Women

Medal table (unofficial)

Participation (unofficial)
The participation of athletes from 15 countries was reported by the Pacific Islands Athletics Statistics publication.

 
 
 
 
 
 
 
 
 
 
 
 
/

References

Oceania Athletics Championships
Athletics in Tonga
Oceanian Championships
1998 in Tongan sport
International sports competitions hosted by Tonga
August 1998 sports events in Oceania